This is a list of fellows of the Royal Society elected in its sixth year, 1665.

Fellows 
Thomas Blount (b. 1604)
Sir Philippe Carteret (1642–1672)
Sir Richard Corbet (1640–1683)
Daniel Coxe (1640–1730)
John Dolben (1625–1686)
Vital de Dumas (1665–1675)
Sir William Hayward (1617–1704)
Humphrey Henchman (1592–1675)
William Howard (1612–1680)
Charles Howard (1629–1685)
Edward Hyde (1609–1674)
Hugues Louis De Lionne (b. 1665)
George Monck (1608–1670)
Edward Montagu (1602–1671)
Samuel Pepys (1633–1703)
Prince Rupert (1619–1682)
Richard Sackville (1622–1677)
Gilbert Sheldon (1598–1677)
Richard Stearne (1596–1683)
Malachy Thruston (1628–1701)
Sir Theodore de Vaux (1628–1694)
James II  (1633–1701)
Ferdinand Albert  (1636–1687)
Charles II (1630–1686)

References

1665
1665 in science
1665 in England